Realizing Increased Photosynthetic Efficiency (RIPE) is a translational research project that is genetically engineering plants to photosynthesize more efficiently to increase crop yields. RIPE aims to increase agricultural production worldwide, particularly to help reduce hunger and poverty in Sub-Saharan Africa and Southeast Asia by sustainably improving the yield of key food crops including soybeans, rice, cassava and cowpeas. The RIPE project began in 2012, funded by a five-year, $25-million dollar grant from the Bill and Melinda Gates Foundation. In 2017, the project received a $45 million-dollar reinvestment from the Gates Foundation, Foundation for Food and Agriculture Research, and the UK Government's Department for International Development. In 2018, the Gates Foundation contributed an additional $13 million to accelerate the project's progress.

Background
During the 20th century, the Green Revolution dramatically increased yields through advances in plant breeding and land management. This period of agricultural innovation is credited for saving millions of lives. However, these approaches are reaching their biological limits, leading to stagnation in yield improvement. In 2009, the Food and Agriculture Organization projected that global food production must increase by 70% by 2050 to feed an estimated world population of 9 billion people. Meeting the demands of 2050 is further challenged by shrinking arable land, decreasing natural resources, and climate change.

Research
The RIPE project's proof-of-concept study established photosynthesis can be improved to increase yields, published in Science. The Guardian named this discovery one of the 12 key science moments of 2016. Computer model simulations identify strategies to improve the basic underlying mechanisms of photosynthesis and increase yield. First, researchers transform, or genetically engineer, model plants that are tested in controlled environments, e.g. growth chambers and greenhouses. Next, successful transformations are tested in randomized, replicated field trials. Finally, transformations with statistically significant yield increases are translated to the project's target food crops. Likely several approaches could be combined to additively increase yield. "Global access” ensures smallholder farmers will be able to use and afford the project's intellectual property.

Organization

RIPE is led by the University of Illinois at the Carl R. Woese Institute for Genomic Biology. The project's partner institutions include the Australian National University, Chinese Academy of Sciences, Commonwealth Scientific and Industrial Research Organisation, Lancaster University, Louisiana State University, University of California at Berkeley, University of Cambridge, University of Essex, and the United States Department of Agriculture/Agricultural Research Service.

The Executive Committee oversees the various research strategies; its members are listed in the table below.

References

Genetic engineering and agriculture
Research projects
Photosynthesis